This is a list of people from Rotherham who have become known internationally in different roles and professions. Rotherham is a town in South Yorkshire, England.

Renowned people from Rotherham
Baron Ahmed, politician
Dean Andrews, actor
David Artell, footballer
Donald Bailey, civil engineer
Gordon Banks, footballer
Nick Banks, musician
Ian Breckin, footballer
Stephen Brogan, footballer
Chuckle Brothers, comedians
Frank Brown, footballer
Bill Burgess channel swimmer
Jo Callis, musician
Herbert Chapman, football manager
Felicia Dorothea Kate Dover, arsenic poisoner, lived and died in Rotherham after her release from prison.
Dean Downing, cyclist
Russell Downing, cyclist
Ebenezer Elliott, poet
Peter Elliott, athlete
Scott Flinders, footballer
Charles Sydney Gibbes, tutor and monk
Dave Godin, anarchist and musicologist
Paul Goodison, Olympic gold medal winning sailor
Justine Greening, politician
Simon Guy, cricketer
William Hague, former leader of the Conservative Party
Matt Hamshaw, footballer
Paul Harrison, racing driver
Edward Heppenstall, theologian
Alan Hodgkinson, former England national football team goalkeeper
Daniel Howell, research scientist
Joe Hunter, cricketer
Alf Lee  English professional footballer
Daisy Makeig-Jones, sculptor
David Miedzianik, poet
Laurie Millsom, footballer
Simon Mottram, entrepreneur
Matt Nicholls, musician
Lynne Perrie, actress
Duggie Brown, Comedian, brother of Lynn Perry
Gervase Phinn, author
Frederick Brian Pickering, metallurgist
Sandy Powell, comedian
Chris Rawlinson, athlete
Frazer Richardson, footballer
Archbishop Thomas Rotherham, cleric and minister
Colin Rowe, professor of architecture
Ryan Sampson, actor
Bishop Robert Sanderson, minister and logician
David Seaman, former England national football team goalkeeper
Jack P. Shepherd, Coronation Street actor
Paul Shane, comedian
Ernie Stevenson, footballer
Ben Swift, cyclist
Rebecca Lucy Taylor, musician
Trevor Taylor, motor racing driver
Michael Turley, footballer
Raymond Unwin, town planner
Colin Walker, footballer
Michael Walsh, footballer
Howard Webb, football referee
Liz White, actress
Chris Wolstenholme, musician

References

 
Rotherham
Rotherham